The Sustainable and Secure Buildings Act 2004 (c 22) is an Act of the Parliament of the United Kingdom.

Andrew Stunell MP states "The Act creates new powers to make Building Regulations on these topics [that is sustainable eco-friendly buildings, secure against climate and environmental changes], and also requires the Government to report to Parliament every two years on what it has done. The next task is to make quite sure the new Act doesn't just sit on a shelf getting dusty, but that the necessary regulations come forward quickly, and that the first report to Parliament demonstrates real progress being made."

Section 6 - Secretary of State to report on building stock
The functions of the Secretary of State under this section were, so far as exercisable in relation to Wales, transferred to the Welsh Ministers by article 2(b)(i) of the Welsh Ministers (Transfer of Functions) (No. 2) Order 2009 (S.I. ). See also article 5.

Section 11 - Short title, repeals, commencement and extent
The Sustainable and Secure Buildings Act 2004 (Commencement No. 1) Order 2006 (S.I.  (C. 4) was made under section 11(3).

Section 11(4) provides that sections 1 and 3(1) to (7) and 4(1) to (3) and (5) and 6 and 10 and 11(1) and (3) to (5) of the Act came into force at the end of the period of two months that began on the date on which it was passed. The word "months" means calendar months. The day (that is to say, 16 September 2004) on which the Act was passed (that is to say, received royal assent) is included in the period of two months. This means that the aforesaid sections came into force on 16 November 2004.

References
Halsbury's Statutes,

External links
The Sustainable and Secure Buildings Act 2004, as amended from the National Archives.
The Sustainable and Secure Buildings Act 2004, as originally enacted from the National Archives.

United Kingdom Acts of Parliament 2004
Housing legislation in the United Kingdom